Iraj Soleimani (15 December 1946 – 23 February 2009) was an Iranian professional footballer. Soleimani was born in Masjed Soleiman, Khuzestan, Iran. He played for Shahbaz F.C. and capped for Persepolis F.C. 115 times. He scored 2 goals in the Tehran derby that Persepolis won with 6 goals. He managed Iran U23 from 1980 to 1982.

Persepolis F.C. players
Iranian footballers
1946 births
2009 deaths
People from Masjed Soleyman
Association football forwards
Sportspeople from Khuzestan province